Iftekhar Sajjad (born 20 August 1991) is a Bangladeshi cricketer who plays for Chittagong Division. He made his Twenty20 debut on 31 May 2021, for Shinepukur Cricket Club in the 2021 Dhaka Premier Division Twenty20 Cricket League.

See also
 List of Chittagong Division cricketers

References

External links
 

1991 births
Living people
Bangladeshi cricketers
Chittagong Division cricketers
Shinepukur Cricket Club cricketers
People from Chittagong